Nameless Sound is an organization based in Houston, Texas founded by musician David Dove, which presents international contemporary music and new methods in arts education.  Nameless Sound presents concerts by premiere artists in the world of creative music.  In addition, Nameless Sound and its artists work directly with young people in public schools, community centers, and homeless shelters. Nameless Sound also presents a weekly experimental music series at the Lawndale Arts Center called They, Who Sound.

History
In 1997, David Dove began developing a unique approach to music education based on creativity and diversity through his work with adolescents at MECA (Multicultural Education and Counseling Through the Arts). In 2000, he founded Deep Listening Institute Houston (a branch of a New York organization founded by Pauline Oliveros), to bring world-class artists to Houston and further his teaching goals. In 2006, under Dove’s direction, Deep Listening Institute Houston became Nameless Sound, an independent Houston-based 501(c)3. That same year, Nameless Sound expanded to include two classes for people with special needs (the mentally-challenged and autistic) and a Creative Kids Ensemble (grades K though 8th) in addition to its Youth Ensemble, public school workshops, and homeless shelter workshops. In 2008, Nameless Sound added a class for refugee children (political asylum seekers).  Nameless Sound has become the most important regional presenter of creative music, contemporary jazz, and free improvisation, making Houston an important center for this cutting edge art form. Nameless Sound has also become known nationally for a new type of music education, emphasizing creativity, improvisation, and diversity.

Resounding Vision Award
Nameless Sound created The Resounding Vision Award to honor "musicians whose efforts transcend aesthetics and resonate beyond the performance venue." Musicians who are given this award have had extensive community involvement. In 2013, a Community Resounding Vision Award was added, honoring arts patrons in Houston who have similarly supported the local community. The first recipients were arts patrons (and music lovers) Susie and Sanford Criner

Winners and Nominees

See also
Houston Alternative Art

Notable musicians
Notable musicians who have performed at Nameless Sound:

Tetuzi Akiyama
Susan Alcorn
Han Bennink
Borbetomagus
Peter Brötzmann
Dave Burrell
John Butcher
Mats Gustafsson
Ingebrigt Håker Flaten
Fred Frith
Keiji Haino
Susie Ibarra
Sachiko M
Sabir Mateen
Joe McPhee
Louis Moholo
Jemeel Moondoc
Toshimaru Nakamura
Maggie Nicols
Paal Nilssen-Love
Pauline Oliveros
William Parker
Maja Ratkje
Matana Roberts
Matthew Shipp
Ken Vandermark
Roswell Rudd
Cooper-Moore
Damon Smith

References

External links
Official website

Organizations based in Houston